Dmitry Petrovich Dokhturov (May 25, 1838 – March 25, 1905) was an Imperial Russian brigade, division and corps commander. He fought in the wars in the Caucasus and against the Ottoman Empire.

Ranks 
 Poruchik (April 23, 1859)
 Stabskapitän (January 12, 1861)
 Captain (November 28, 1861)
 Rittmeister (April 17, 1863)
 Podpolkovnik (lieutenant colonel) (September 13, 1864)
 Polkovnik (colonel) (March 27, 1866)
 Major general (September 14, 1877)
 Lieutenant general (August 30, 1886)
 General of the cavalry (December 6, 1898)

Awards 
 Order of Saint Stanislaus (House of Romanov), 3rd class, 1861
 Order of Saint Vladimir, 4th class, 1863
 Order of Saint Stanislaus (House of Romanov), 2nd class, 1868
 Order of Saint Anna, 2nd class, 1871
 Order of Saint Vladimir, 3rd class, 1874
 Gold Sword for Bravery, 1877
 Order of Saint Stanislaus (House of Romanov), 1st class, 1879
 Order of Saint Anna, 1st class, 1882
 Order of Saint Vladimir, 2nd class, 1885
 Order of the White Eagle, 1890
 Order of Saint Alexander Nevsky, 1896

External links 
 Новодевичье кладбище
 Деревня Елисеевка и её округа
 Военная энциклопедия
 Биография

1838 births
1905 deaths
People of the Caucasian War
Russian military personnel of the Russo-Turkish War (1877–1878)
Recipients of the Order of Saint Stanislaus (Russian), 3rd class
Recipients of the Order of St. Vladimir, 4th class
Recipients of the Order of Saint Stanislaus (Russian), 2nd class
Recipients of the Order of St. Anna, 2nd class
Recipients of the Order of St. Vladimir, 3rd class
Recipients of the Gold Sword for Bravery
Recipients of the Order of Saint Stanislaus (Russian), 1st class
Recipients of the Order of St. Anna, 1st class
Recipients of the Order of St. Vladimir, 2nd class
Recipients of the Order of the White Eagle (Russia)
Russian nobility